This is a list of the heritage sites in the Western Cape Province, South Africa, as recognized by the South African Heritage Resource Agency.

For additional provincial heritage sites declared by Heritage Western Cape, the provincial heritage resources authority of the  Western Cape Province of South Africa, please see the entries at the end of the list.  These sites have been declared subsequent to the implementation of the new legislation on 1 April 2000 and unlike those in the SAHRA portion of the list are not former national monuments declared by the former National Monuments Council, the predecessor of both SAHRA and Heritage Western Cape. In the instance of these sites the "identifier" code used is that of Heritage Western Cape rather than SAHRA.

For performance reasons, the following districts have been split off:

 List of heritage sites in Beaufort West
 List of heritage sites in Bellville
 List of heritage sites in Caledon
 List of heritage sites in Cape Town CBD, the Waterfront, and the Bo-Kaap
 List of heritage sites near Cape Town
 List of heritage sites in Clanwilliam
 List of heritage sites in George and Mossel Bay
 List of heritage sites in Knysna
 List of heritage sites in Paarl
 List of heritage sites in Simonstown
 List of heritage sites in Robertson and Montagu
 List of heritage sites in Stellenbosch, Somerset West, and Strand
 List of heritage sites in Swellendam and Riversdale
 List of heritage sites in Table Mountain
 List of heritage sites in Tulbagh
 List of heritage sites in Worcester
 List of heritage sites in Wynberg

|}

References

Western Cape
Tourist attractions in the Western Cape
Lime kilns in South Africa